Nagaoka dialect is a dialect of the Japanese language spoken in Chūetsu region centered Nagaoka city in Niigata prefecture of Japan. Nagaoka dialect is similar to Niigata dialect spoken in the Shin'etsu region. It differs somewhat from town to town.

Accent
The accent of the Nagaoka dialect is classified as being among the outer range of the Tokyo accent group. With the development of modern media and transportation in recent years, there has been a trend, mostly among younger people, to use the middle range of the Tokyo accent group, which was originally used only in Itoigawa. For example, two-syllable words originally having a heiban accent, meaning a word ending with a high pitch that carries over to the following particle, have changed to an odaka accent, meaning the high pitch no longer carries over to the particle.

Some additional difference from the standard Tokyo dialect:

Grammar

ga
The postposition ga is probably the best known element of the Nagaoka dialect. It is typically placed at the end of sentences to alter the speaker's tone. It is basically equivalent to (no da) yo or no in standard Japanese. It is often pronounced with a lengthened vowel sound, i.e. gā, written in Japanese as がー or がぁ.
Features of ga:
When spoken with rising intonation it can often indicate a question, while falling intonation often shows the speaker's understanding or concent.
Unlike regular postpositions, additional postpositions can be added after ga, such as ka, ya and te.
The copula da/desu and the polite form -masu can be abbreviated when ga is added, e.g. "This is Nagaoka." which would be rendered in standard Japanese as Koko wa Nagaoka na n da (ここは長岡なんだ) would be Koko wa Nagaoka n ga (ここは長岡んが) (Note that na has also been lost). Other auxiliary verbs are not removed.

te
Like ga, te is generally attached to the end of a sentence, and carries a meaning similar to (da) yo in standard Japanese. Unlike ga, however, da, desu and -masu are not removed when te is added, e.g. "This is Nagaoka", rendered in standard Japanese as Koko wa Nagaoka da yo (ここは長岡だよ) would be Koko wa Nagaoka da te (ここは長岡だて) in Nagaoka dialect.

ra
The copula da and its derivative darō are replaced with ra and raro, e.g. standard Japanese Sō darō? (そうだろう？) becomes Sō raro? (そうらろ？) in Nagaoka dialect.

Vocabulary

Below is a list of example words from the Nagaoka dialect:

References 

Japanese dialects
Culture in Niigata Prefecture
Nagaoka, Niigata